Auxesis may refer to:

 Auxesis (genus), a genus of longhorn beetles
 Auxesis (biology), expansion of cell size
 Auxesis (figure of speech), exaggerated language